A jackdaw is a bird in the crow family in the genus Coloeus. 

Jackdaw or jackdaws may also refer to:

Birds
 Western jackdaw (Coloeus monedula), often referred to as just "jackdaw"

Arts and entertainment
 Jackdaw (band), a Celtic rock group from New York state
 The Jackdaw, a British art magazine
 Jackdaws (novel), a spy thriller by Ken Follett
 Jackdaw Publications, a publishing company acquired by Rosen Publishing in 2015

Fictional characters and elements
 Jackdaw (Marvel Comics), the heroic sidekick of Captain Britain
 Blackbird (Femizon), a Marvel Comics antagonist (formerly Jackdaw)
 Jackdaw, a ship in the Assassin's Creed IV: Black Flag video game

Ships
 HMS Jackdaw, a list of ships with this name
 USS Jackdaw, a list of ships with this name

See also
 Jack Daws (born 1970), American artist
 Jackdaw Cake, an autobiography by British author Norman Lewis
 "Jackdaw of Rheims", the best-known poem in The Ingoldsby Legends
 Jackdaw Quarry, a geological site of Special Scientific Interest in Gloucestershire, England

Animal common name disambiguation pages